James Price (24 April 1896 – q1 1970) was a Scottish professional footballer who played as a defender.

References

1896 births
1970 deaths
Scottish footballers
Association football defenders
Celtic F.C. players
Dumbarton F.C. players
Airdrieonians F.C. (1878) players
Ashington A.F.C. players
Nelson F.C. players
Scottish Football League players
English Football League players